The Macau Design Centre (MDC) is a center in Nossa Senhora de Fátima, Macau, China to promote cultural creative industry in the region.

History
The center was established on 15 November 2014 by Macau Designers Association.

Architecture
The 5-story center is housed in a former factory. It consists of bookstore, cafeteria, creative stores, exhibition hall, lab, meeting room, mezzanine, rooftop garden, stage and studio.

See also
 List of tourist attractions in Macau

References

External links
 
 
 Macau Design Center on YouTube

2014 establishments in Macau
Buildings and structures in Macau
Macau Peninsula